"Poland Is Not Yet Lost", also known as "Mazurek Dąbrowskiego", and the "Song of the Polish Legions in Italy", is the national anthem of the Republic of Poland. 

The original lyrics were written by Józef Wybicki in Reggio Emilia, in Northern Italy, between 16 and 19 July 1797, two years after the Third Partition of Poland erased the Polish–Lithuanian Commonwealth from the map. Its initial purpose was to raise the morale of Jan Henryk Dąbrowski's Polish Legions that served with Napoleon Bonaparte in the Italian campaigns of the French Revolutionary Wars. "Mazurek Dąbrowskiego" expressed the idea that the nation of Poland, despite lacking an independent state of their own, had not disappeared as long as the Polish people endured and fought in its name.

The music is an unattributed mazurka and considered a "folk tune" that Polish composer Edward Pałłasz categorizes as "functional art" which was "fashionable among the gentry and rich bourgeoisie". Pałłasz wrote, "Wybicki probably made use of melodic motifs he had heard and combined them in one formal structure to suit the text".

When Poland re-emerged as an independent state in 1918, "Mazurek Dąbrowskiego" became its de facto national anthem. It was officially adopted as the national anthem of Poland in 1927. It also inspired similar songs by other peoples struggling for independence during the 19th century, such as the Ukrainian national anthem and the song "Hej, Sloveni" which was used as the national anthem of socialist Yugoslavia during that state's existence.

Etymology

It is also known by its original title, "" ("Song of the Polish Legions in Italy"). English translations of its Polish incipit ("" ) include: "Poland has not yet perished", "Poland has not perished yet", "Poland is not lost", "Poland is not lost yet", and "Poland is not yet lost".

Lyrics 

The original lyrics, authored by Wybicki, are a poem consisting of six quatrains and a refrain quatrain repeated after all but the last stanza, all following an ABAB rhyme scheme. The official lyrics, based on a variant from 1806, "Poland has not yet died" suggesting a more violent cause of the nation's possible death. Wybicki's original manuscript was in the hands of his descendants until February 1944, when it was lost in Wybicki's great-great-grandson, Johann von Roznowski's home in Charlottenburg during the Allied bombing of Berlin. The manuscript is known today only from facsimile copies, twenty four of which were made in 1886 by Edward Rożnowski, Wybicki's grandson, who donated them to Polish libraries.

The main theme of the poem is the idea that was novel in the times of early nationalisms based on centralized nation-statesthat the lack of political sovereignty does not preclude the existence of a nation. As Adam Mickiewicz explained in 1842 to students of Slavic Literature in Paris, the song "The famous song of the Polish legions begins with lines that express the new history: Poland has not perished yet as long as we live. These words mean that people who have in them what constitutes the essence of a nation can prolong the existence of their country regardless of its political circumstances and may even strive to make it real again..." The song also includes a call to arms and expresses the hope that, under General Dąbrowski's command, the legionaries would rejoin their nation and retrieve "what the alien force has seized" through armed struggle.

The chorus and subsequent stanzas include heart-lifting examples of military heroes, set as role models for Polish soldiers: Jan Henryk Dąbrowski, Napoleon, Stefan Czarniecki and Tadeusz Kościuszko. Dąbrowski, for whom the anthem is named, was a commander in the failed 1794 Kościuszko Uprising against Russia. After the Third Partition in 1795, he came to Paris to seek French aid in re-establishing Polish independence and, in 1796, he started the formation of the Polish Legions, a Polish unit of the French Revolutionary Army. Bonaparte was, at the time when the song was written, a commander of the Italian campaign of French Revolutionary Wars and Dąbrowski's superior. Having already proven his skills as a military leader, he is described in the lyrics as the one "who has shown us ways to victory." Bonaparte is the only non-Polish person mentioned by name in the Polish anthem.

Stefan Czarniecki was a 17th-century hetman, famous for his role in driving the Swedish army out of Poland after an occupation that had left the country in ruins and is remembered by Poles as the Deluge. With the outbreak of a Dano-Swedish War, he continued his fight against Sweden in Denmark, from where he "returned across the sea" to fight the invaders alongside the king who was then at the Royal Castle in Poznań. In the same castle, Józef Wybicki, started his career as a lawyer (in 1765). Kościuszko, mentioned in a stanza now missing from the anthem, became a hero of the American Revolutionary War before coming back to Poland to defend his native country from Russia in the war of 1792 and a national uprising he led in 1794. One of his major victories during the uprising was the Battle of Racławice where the result was partly due to Polish peasants armed with scythes. Alongside the scythes, the song mentioned other types of weaponry, traditionally used by the Polish szlachta, or nobility: the sabre, known in Polish as szabla, and the backsword.

Basia (a female name, diminutive of Barbara) and her father are fictional characters. They are used to represent the women and elderly men who waited for the Polish soldiers to return home and liberate their fatherland. The route that Dąbrowski and his legions hoped to follow upon leaving Italy is hinted at by the words "we'll cross the Vistula, we'll cross the Warta", two major rivers flowing through the parts of Poland that were in Austrian and Prussian hands at the time.

Music 

The melody of the Polish anthem is a lively and rhythmical mazurka. Mazurka as a musical form derives from the stylization of traditional melodies for the folk dances of Mazovia, a region in central Poland. It is characterized by a triple meter and strong accents placed irregularly on the second or third beat. Considered one of Poland's national dances in pre-partition times, it owes its popularity in 19th-century West European ballrooms to the mazurkas of Frédéric Chopin.

The composer of "Mazurek Dąbrowskiego" is unknown. The melody is most probably Wybicki's adaptation of a folk tune that had already been popular during the second half of the 18th century. The composition used to be erroneously attributed to Michał Kleofas Ogiński who was known to have written a march for Dąbrowski's legions. Several historians confused Ogiński's "" ("March for the Polish Legions") with Wybicki's mazurka, possibly due to the mazurka's chorus "March, march, Dąbrowski", until Ogiński's sheet music for the march was discovered in 1938 and proven to be a different piece of music than Poland's national anthem.

The first composer to use the anthem for an artistical music piece is always stated to be Karol Kurpiński. In 1821 he composed his piano/organ Fugue on "Jeszcze Polska nie zginęła" (it was published in 1821 in Warsaw; the first modern edition by Rostislaw Wygranienko was printed only in 2009). However, Karol Lipiński used it in an overture for his opera Kłótnia przez zakład composed and staged in Lviv ca.1812.

 was the next who arranged "Mazurek Dąbrowskiego" for the piano. The arrangement, accompanied by the lyrics in Polish and French, was published 1829 in Paris. German composers who were moved by the suffering of the November Uprising wove the mazurek into their works. Examples include Richard Wagner's Polonia Overture and Albert Lortzing's Der Pole und sein Kind.

The current official musical score of the national anthem was arranged by Kazimierz Sikorski and published by the Polish Ministry of Culture and National Heritage. Sikorski's harmonization allows for each vocal version to be performed either a cappella or together with any of the instrumental versions. Some orchestra parts, marked in the score as ad libitum, may be left out or replaced by other instruments of equivalent musical scale.

In 1908, Ignacy Jan Paderewski, later to become the first Prime Minister of independent Poland, quoted the anthem in a disguised way in his Symphony in B minor "Polonia". He scored it in duple meter rather than its standard triple meter.

The anthem was quoted by Edward Elgar in his symphonic prelude Polonia, composed in 1915.

Regulations 
The national anthem is, along with the national coat of arms and the national colors, one of three national symbols defined by the Polish constitution.
As such, it is protected by law which declares that treating the national symbols "with reverence and respect" is the "right and obligation" of every Polish citizen and all state organs, institutions and organizations. The anthem should be performed or reproduced especially at celebrations of national holidays and anniversaries. Civilians should pay respect to the anthem by standing in a dignified manner; additionally, men should uncover their heads. Members of uniformed services should stand at attention; if their uniform includes headgear and they are not standing in an organized group, they should also perform the two-finger salute. The song is required to be played in the key of F-major if played for a public purpose. Color guards pay respect to the anthem by dipping their banners.

History

Origin 

In 1795, after a prolonged decline and despite last-minute attempts at constitutional reforms and armed resistance, the Polish–Lithuanian Commonwealth was ultimately partitioned by its three neighbors: Russia, Prussia and Austria. A once vast and powerful empire was effectively erased from the map while monarchs of the partitioning powers pledged never to use the name "Poland" in their official titles. For many, including even leading representatives of the Polish Enlightenment, this new political situation meant an end of the Polish nation. In the words of Hugo Kołłątaj, a notable Polish political thinker of the time, "Poland no longer belonged to currently extant nations," while historian Tadeusz Czacki declared that Poland "was now effaced from the number of nations."

Meanwhile, Polish patriots and revolutionaries turned for help to France, Poland's traditional ally, which was at war with Austria (member of the First Coalition) at the time. Józef Wybicki was among the leading moderate émigré politicians seeking French aid in re-establishing Polish independence. In 1796, he came up with the idea of creating Polish Legions within the French Revolutionary Army. To this end, he convinced General Jan Henryk Dąbrowski, a hero of the Greater Poland campaign of the 1794 Kościuszko Uprising, to come to Paris and present the plan to the French Directory. Dąbrowski was sent by the Directory to Napoleon who was then spreading the French Revolution in northern Italy. In January 1797, the newly created French-controlled Cisalpine Republic accepted Dąbrowski's offer and a Polish legion was formed. Dąbrowski and his soldiers hoped to fight against Austria under Napoleon and, subsequently, march across the Austrian territory, "from Italy to Poland", where they would ignite a national uprising.

In early July 1797, Wybicki arrived in Reggio Emilia where the Polish Legions were then quartered and where he wrote the Song of the Polish Legions soon afterwards. He first sung it at a private meeting of Polish officers in the Legions' headquarters at the episcopal palace in Reggio. The first public performance most probably took place on 16 July 1797 during a military parade in Reggio's Piazza del Duomo (Cathedral Square). On 20 July, it was played again as the Legions were marching off from Reggio to Milan, the Cisalpine capital.

With its heart-lifting lyrics and folk melody, the song soon became a popular tune among Polish legionaries. On 29 August 1797, Dąbrowski already wrote to Wybicki from Bologna: "soldiers gain more and more taste for your song." It appealed to both officers, usually émigré noblemen, and simple soldiers, most of whom were Galician peasants who had been drafted into the Austrian army and captured as POWs by the French. The last stanza, referring to Kościuszko, who famously fought for freedom of the entire nation rather than the nobility alone, and the "scythes of Racławice", seems to be directed particularly at the latter. Wybicki may have even hoped for Kościuszko to arrive in Italy and personally lead the Legions which might explain why the chorus "March, march, Dąbrowski" is not repeated after the last stanza. At that time Wybicki was not yet aware that Kościuszko had already returned to Philadelphia.

Rising popularity 
The song became popular in Poland as soon as late 1797 and quickly became an object of variations and modifications. It also added four new stanzas, now forgotten, written from the viewpoint of Polish patriots waiting for General Dąbrowski to bring freedom and human rights to Poland.

The ultimate fate of the Polish Legions in Italy was different from that promised by Wybicki's song. Rather than coming back to Poland, they were exploited by the French government to quell uprisings in Italy, Germany and, later, in Haiti where they were decimated by war and disease. Polish national hopes were revived with the outbreak of a Franco-Prussian war (part of the War of the Fourth Coalition) in 1806. Napoleon called Dąbrowski and Wybicki to come back from Italy and help gather support for the French army in Polish-populated parts of Prussia. On 6 November 1806, both generals arrived in Poznań, enthusiastically greeted by locals singing "Poland Is Not Yet Lost". The ensuing Greater Poland Uprising and Napoleon's victory over Russian forces at Friedland led to the creation of a French-controlled Polish puppet state known as the Duchy of Warsaw.

"Poland Is Not Yet Lost" was one of the most popular patriotic songs in the duchy, stopping short of becoming that entity's national anthem. Among other occasions, it was sung in Warsaw on 16 June 1807 to celebrate the battle of Friedland, in Kraków as it was liberated by Prince Józef Poniatowski on 19 July 1809, and at a ball in Warsaw on 23 December 1809, the birthday of Frederick Augustus, King of Saxony and Duke of Warsaw. On the occasion of Dąbrowski's name day on 25 December 1810 in Poznań, Dąbrowski and Wybicki led the mazurka to the tune of "Poland Is Not Yet Lost". Although the melody of Wybicki's song remained unchanged and widely known, the lyrics kept changing. With the signing of a Franco-Russian alliance at Tilsit in 1807, the fourth stanza, specifically mentioning Russians as Poland's enemies, was removed. The last stanza, referring to Kościuszko, who had grown suspicious of Napoleon and refused to lend his support to the emperor's war in Poland, met the same fate.

The anthem is mentioned twice in Pan Tadeusz, the Polish national epic written by Adam Mickiewicz in 1834, but set in the years 1811–1812. The author makes the first reference to the song when Tadeusz, the main protagonist, returns home and, recalling childhood memories, pulls the string of a chiming clock to hear the "old Dąbrowski's Mazurka" once again. Musical boxes and musical clocks playing the melody of Poland Is Not Yet Lost belonged to popular patriotic paraphernalia of that time. The song appears in the epic poem again when Jankiel, a Jewish dulcimerist and ardent Polish patriot, plays the mazurka in the presence of General Dąbrowski himself.

With Napoleon's defeat and the Congress of Vienna in 1815 came a century of foreign domination over Poland interspersed with occasional bursts of armed rebellion. Poland Is Not Yet Lost continued to be sung throughout that period, especially during national uprisings. During the November Uprising against Russia in 1830–1831, the song was chanted in the battlefields of Stoczek, Olszynka Grochowska and Iganie. In peacetime, Polish patriots performed it at homes, official functions and political demonstrations. New variants of the song, of various artistic value and length of life, abounded. At least 16 alternative versions were penned during the November Uprising alone. At times, Dąbrowski's name was replaced by other national heroes: from Józef Chłopicki during the November Uprising to Józef Piłsudski during the First World War to Władysław Sikorski during the Second World War. New lyrics were also written in regional dialects of Polish, from Silesia to Ermland and Masuria. A variant known as Marsz Polonii ("March Polonia") spread among Polish immigrants in the Americas.

Mass political emigration following the defeat of the November Uprising, known as the Great Emigration, brought Poland Is Not Yet Lost to Western Europe. It soon found favor from Britain to France to Germany where it was performed as a token of sympathy with the Polish cause. It was also highly esteemed in Central Europe where various, mostly Slavic, peoples struggling for their own independence, looked to the Polish anthem for inspiration. Back in Poland, however, especially in the parts under Russian and Prussian rule, it was becoming increasingly risky to sing the anthem in public. Polish patriotic songs were banned in Prussia in 1850; between 1873 and 1911, German courts passed 44 sentences for singing such songs, 20 of which were specifically for singing Poland Is Not Yet Lost. In Russian Poland, public performance of the song often ended with a police intervention.

Choice of national anthem 
When Poland re-emerged as an independent state after World War I in 1918, it had to make a decision about its national symbols. While the coat of arms and the flag were officially adopted as soon as 1919, the question of a national anthem had to wait. Apart from "Poland Is Not Yet Lost", there were other popular patriotic songs which could compete for the status of an official national anthem.

In the Middle Ages, the role of a national anthem was played by hymns. Among them were Bogurodzica, one of the oldest (11th–12th century) known literary texts in Polish, and the Latin Gaude Mater Polonia ("Rejoice, Mother Poland"), written in the 13th century to celebrate the canonization of Bishop Stanislaus of Szczepanów, the patron saint of Poland. Both were chanted on special occasions and on battlefields. The latter is sung nowadays at university ceremonies. During the Renaissance and the Enlightenment, several songs, both religious and secular, were written with the specific purpose of creating a new national anthem. Examples include the 16th-century Latin prayer  ("Prayer for the Commonwealth and the King") by a Calvinist poet, Andrzej Trzeciński, and "" ("Hymn to the Love of the Fatherland") written in 1744 by Prince-Bishop Ignacy Krasicki. They failed, however, to win substantial favor with the populace. Another candidate was "" ("God is Born"), whose melody was originally a 16th-century coronation polonaise (dance) for Polish kings.

The official anthem of the Russian-controlled Congress Kingdom of Poland was "" ( "National Song to the King's Well-being") written in 1816 by Alojzy Feliński and Jan Kaszewski. Initially unpopular, it evolved in the early 1860s into an important religious and patriotic hymn. The final verse, which originally begged "Save, Oh Lord, our King", was substituted with "Return us, Oh Lord, our free Fatherland" while the melody was replaced with that of a Marian hymn. The result, known today as Boże, coś Polskę (from the first lines "Boże! Coś Polskę przez tak liczne wieki / Otaczał blaskiem potęgi i chwały...", "Lord! Who for so many ages enclosed Poland with the light of power and glory..."), has been sung in Polish churches ever since, with the final verse alternating between "Return..." and "Bless, Oh Lord, our free Fatherland", depending on Poland's political situation.

A national song that was particularly popular during the November Uprising was "Warszawianka", originally written in French as "" by Casimir Delavigne, with melody by Karol Kurpiński. The song praised Polish insurgents taking their ideals from the French July Revolution of 1830. A peasant rebellion against Polish nobles, which took place in western Galicia in 1846 and was encouraged by Austrian authorities who wished to thwart a new uprising attempt, moved Kornel Ujejski to write a mournful chorale entitled "" ("With the Smoke of Fires"). In 1908, Maria Konopnicka and Feliks Nowowiejski created "Rota" ("The Oath"), a song protesting against the oppression of the Polish population of the German Empire, who were subject to eviction from their land and forced assimilation. First publicly performed in 1910, during a quincentennial celebration of the Polish–Lithuanian victory over the Teutonic Knights at Grunwald, it too became one of the most treasured national Polish songs.

At the inauguration of the UN in 1945, no delegation from Poland had been invited. The Polish pianist Artur Rubinstein, who was to perform the opening concert at the inauguration, began the concert by stating his deep disappointment that the conference did not have a delegation from Poland. Rubinstein later described becoming overwhelmed by a blind fury and angrily pointing out to the public the absence of the Polish flag. He then sat down to the piano and played "Poland Is Not Yet Lost" loudly and slowly, repeating the final part in a great thunderous forte. When he had finished, the public rose to their feet and gave him a great ovation.

Over 60 years later, on 2005-09-22, Aleksander Kwaśniewski, President of Poland, said:

Influence 
During the European Revolutions of 1848, "Poland Is Not Yet Lost" won favor throughout Europe as a revolutionary anthem. This led the Slovak poet Samo Tomášik to write the ethnic anthem, "Hej, Sloveni", based on the melody of the Polish national anthem. It was later adopted by the First Congress of the Pan-Slavic Movement in Prague as the Pan-Slavic Anthem. During the Second World War, a translation of this anthem became the national anthem of Yugoslavia, and later, Serbia and Montenegro. The similarity of the anthems sometimes caused confusion during these countries' football or volleyball matches. However, after the 2006 split between the two, neither Serbia nor Montenegro kept the song as its national anthem, instead choosing "Bože pravde" and "Oj, svijetla majska zoro" respectively. The Polish national anthem is also notable for influencing the lyrics of the Ukrainian anthem, "Shche ne vmerla Ukrayina" (Ukraine's glory has not yet perished).

The line "Poland is not lost yet" has become proverbial in some languages. For example, in German, noch ist Polen nicht verloren is a common saying meaning "all is not lost".

Additionally, the Italian anthem, Il Canto degli Italiani, contains a reference to the Partitions of Poland by Prussia, Austria and Russia, due to the close relations between the two countries.

Notes

References

Further reading

External links

 Poland: "Mazurek Dąbrowskiego" (Poland Is Not Yet Lost), Audio, information, lyrics (archive link)
 Museum of the National Anthem at Będomin – A museum dedicated to the National Anthem (Polish)
 The Polish National Anthem – The promotional website "Polska" features a page on the anthem with an instrumental version.
 Hymn Polski – The website for the Center for Citizenship Education features a page on the anthem than includes vocal and instrumental versions.
 Virtual Library of Polish Literature – A copy of the oldest known recording of the anthem, 1926 by Ignacy Dygas, is available here.
 Russian-Records.com – Edison phonograph cylinder record performed by Stanisław Bolewski. It is probably the oldest recording of the anthem.

1797 compositions
National anthems
National symbols of Poland
Polish patriotic songs
Italy–Poland relations
Polish Legions (Napoleonic period)
European anthems
Polish nationalism (1795–1918)
1797 in Poland
National anthem compositions in F major
Mazurka